White Fang is a 1936 American action film directed by David Butler and written by Sam Duncan, Gene Fowler and Hal Long. The film stars Michael Whalen, Jean Muir, Slim Summerville, Charles Winninger, John Carradine and Jane Darwell. It is based on the 1906 novel White Fang by Jack London. The film was released on July 17, 1936, by 20th Century Fox.

Plot
A woman and her weakling brother inherit a mine, but when her brother commits suicide, their guide is accused of murder.

Cast  
Michael Whalen as Gordon Weedon Scott
Jean Muir as Sylvia Burgess
Slim Summerville as Slats Magee
Charles Winninger as Doc McFane
John Carradine as Beauty Smith
Jane Darwell as Maud Mahoney
Thomas Beck as Hal Burgess
Joseph Herrick as Kobi
George Du Count as François
Marie Chorre as Nomi
Lightning as White Fang

References

External links 
 

1936 films
1930s English-language films
American action films
1930s action films
20th Century Fox films
Films based on White Fang
Films directed by David Butler
Films scored by Hugo Friedhofer
American black-and-white films
Northern (genre) films
1930s American films